The 352nd Special Operations Support Squadron is an active land-based unit within the 752nd Special Operations Group (752nd SOG), 352nd Special Operations Wing (352nd SOW), United States Air Force, United States European Command, and is based at Royal Air Force base RAF Mildenhall, in Suffolk, eastern England.

Mission

352nd Special Operations Support Squadron provides support for two flying squadrons, one special tactics squadron and one maintenance squadron for exercise, logistics, and deployment planning; aircrew training; communications; aerial delivery; medical; intelligence; security and force protection; weather; information technologies and transformation support; and current operations.

The expeditionary design and flexibility of the 352nd OSS is regularly showcased and highlighted by its ability to operate simultaneously in up to four locations. The squadron's attitude allows the group commander to focus on force application and project specialized combat air power in the EUCOM area of responsibility and elsewhere.

Assignments

This is where the command foundation structures of the 352nd Special Operations Wing and 752nd Special Operations Group are located and therefore the Operations Support Squadron must effectively plan for all the needs of the other squadrons in the 352nd Special Operations Wing:
752nd Special Operations Group
7th Special Operations Squadron
21st Special Operations Squadron
67th Special Operations Squadron 
321st Special Tactics Squadron
352nd Special Operations Maintenance Group
352nd Special Operations Maintenance Squadron

References

External links
352nd Special Operations Group Factsheet

Operations Support 352